Caribou Marsh 29 is a Mi'kmaq reserve in Cape Breton County, Nova Scotia,  southwest of Sydney.

It is an unpopulated reserve, encompassing , and was established on 28 April 1882.

It is administratively part of the Membertou First Nation.

References

Indian reserves in Nova Scotia
Communities in Cape Breton County
Mi'kmaq in Canada